Monypenny is a surname. Notable people with the surname include:

 Charlton Monypenny (1864–1947), 27th Laird of Pitmilly and sprinter 
 Dominic Monypenny (born 1960) Australian Paralympian
 Douglas Monypenny (1878–1900) Scottish international rugby union player
 William Flavelle Monypenny (1866–1912), British journalist
 William Monypenny (American football) (fl. from 1926), American football and basketball coach

See also
 Moneypenny (disambiguation)